A Connecticut Yankee in King Arthur's Court is a 1949 American comedy musical film directed by Tay Garnett and starring Bing Crosby, Rhonda Fleming, Sir Cedric Hardwicke and William Bendix.

Based on the novel A Connecticut Yankee in King Arthur's Court (1889) by Mark Twain, the film is about a mechanic in 1912 who bumps his head and finds himself in Arthurian Britain in AD 528, where he is befriended by a knight and gains power by judicious use of technology. When he falls in love with the King's niece, her fiancé Sir Lancelot takes exception, and when he meddles in the politics of the kingdom, trouble ensues.

Filmed from October to December 1947, A Connecticut Yankee in King Arthur's Court was released on April 22, 1949 and distributed by Paramount Pictures. The film was a popular success and became one of the highlight films of 1949.

Plot
Hank Martin (Bing Crosby), an American mechanic, is knocked out and wakes up in the land of King Arthur. Initially captured and sentenced to die, he is freed and claims to be a wizard, awing King Arthur (Cedric Hardwicke), an aged, semi-perpetual, cold-in-the-nose invalid, and his court with the lighting of a match. Arthur rewards him with a blacksmith shop, a squire (the man who first captured Hank) and the title of Sir Boss.

Hank begins introducing modern flourishes such as jazz music, safety pins, firearms and simple machinery as he attempts to romance the absolutely lovely, fair, graceful and beautiful Alisande la Carteloise (Rhonda Fleming) and a friendship with Sir Sagramore (William Bendix).

Hank's actions incur the hatred of both Merlin (Murvyn Vye) and Morgan le Fay (Virginia Field). Sir Lancelot returns early from a quest to confront Hank regarding Alisandre and the men joust, resulting in Hank humiliating Sir Lancelot but losing Alisandre due to perceived dishonor.

A young girl, having heard Hank is a great wizard, implores him to save her ill father. The man dies, but learning from the girl's widowed mother about injustices the family has faced due to medieval laws inspires Hank to persuade King Arthur to tour his kingdom in disguise to see the true, wretched condition of his subjects. While the king is away, Merlin and Morgan plot to usurp his throne- ending up with the disguised Hank, Sir Sagamore and King Arthur being captured and sold as slaves to Merlin. Alisande, having been told of their plight, attempts to help them but is herself captured though in captivity she admits her love for Hank. She is taken by Merlin and the others are sent to be executed.

Prior knowledge of an eclipse allows Hank to strike fear in his captors, resulting in their release. When Hank rushes to save Alisandre from Merlin's clutches, he is shot and returned to his own time.

Heartsick over losing the woman he loves, he goes on a tour of a British castle. Its owner, Lord Pendragon (Hardwicke again), sends him to see his niece, who bears a striking resemblance to Alisande.

Cast
 Bing Crosby as Hank Martin/Sir Boss
 Rhonda Fleming as Alisande la Carteloise
 Sir Cedric Hardwicke as Lord Pendragon/King Arthur
 William Bendix as Sir Sagramore
 Murvyn Vye as Merlin
 Virginia Field as Morgan le Fay
 Joseph Vitale as Sir Logris
 Henry Wilcoxon as Sir Lancelot
 Richard Webb as Sir Galahad
 Alan Napier as High Executioner
 Charles Coleman as Richard (uncredited)
 Olin Howland as Sam (uncredited)
 Gordon Richards as Tour Guide (uncredited)

Production notes
The film soundtrack was composed by Jimmy Van Heusen with lyrics by Johnny Burke. The orchestral score was written by longtime Paramount staff composer Victor Young, who also conducted the orchestra for many of Crosby's Decca Records recordings.

 "If You Stub Your Toe on the Moon" by Bing Crosby
 "When Is Sometime" by Rhonda Fleming
 "Once and for Always" by Bing Crosby and Rhonda Fleming
 "Busy Doing Nothing" by Bing Crosby, William Bendix and Cedric Hardwicke
 "Once and for Always" (reprise) by Bing Crosby and Rhonda Fleming
 "Twixt Myself and Me" by Murvyn Vye (this was cut from the film after its world premiere at Radio City Music Hall, New York).

A highlight of the film is the scene in which Hank Martin teaches the court musicians how to "jazz up" the medieval music they are playing. Perhaps the best-known song from the score is "Busy Doing Nothing", which Hank, Sir Sagramore and the King sing when they are strolling through the woods pretending to be peasants.

The cast made separate recordings of the songs used in the film for Decca Records in December 1947 and these were issued as a 78rpm album set. Crosby's songs were also included in the Bing's Hollywood series.

Reception
The film opened on April 7, 1949 at Radio City Music Hall in New York City and, together with the Music Hall's annual Easter pageant and stageshow, generated the Music Hall's biggest four-day Easter gross at the time, grossing $146,000 in its first week. The following week, with children out of school and the theatre opening at 7:45 a.m. to enable six showings a day, it grossed a Music Hall record $170,000 and became the number one film in the United States.

Contemporary reviews praised Crosby's performance but had mixed assessments about other aspects of the film. Bosley Crowther of The New York Times was positive, writing: "The solid, reliable humors of Mark Twain’s A Connecticut Yankee in King Arthur's Court, which have already done yeoman service in two films and a Broadway musical show, have been given another going over—with eminently satisfactory results—in Paramount’s new film of the same title, which came to the Music Hall yesterday. And for this we can thank Bing Crosby, primarily and above all, because it is Bing in the role of the Yankee who gives this film its particular charm ... But it is still Bing’s delightful personality, his mild surprises and sweet serenities, and his casual way of handling dialogue that makes this burlesque a success. No one in current operation could qualify, we are sure, to play the Connecticut Yankee the way the old Groaner does. Harrison's Reports also liked the film, calling it "A very good romantic comedy" with "numerous situations that will provoke hearty laughter." Edwin Schallert of the Los Angeles Times wrote: "All in all, I would put this picture well up among Paramount's Crosby features as an effort to accomplish something different ... It is a pleasantly fabulous excursion in the dream classification, and the cutback to the medieval past is effectively enough introduced in this adaptation of the Mark Twain story."
  
Variety was not quite so enthusiastic: "Picture wears the easy casualness that's a Crosby trademark, goes about its entertaining at a leisurely pace, and generally comes off satisfactorily. It's not high comedy and there’s little swashbuckling." Richard L. Coe of The Washington Post wrote that the idea was "so promising that it's a shame the picture collapses," explaining, "The early half of the picture accepts Bing's particular brand of easy charm ... But social welfare work among the downtrodden peasantry (there's even a scene that reminds you of 'Monsieur Vincent') hardly fits into my idea of cheerful musical comedy." John McCarten of The New Yorker wrote that Crosby was "effortlessly amiable," but that the film lacked the wit of the 1931 Will Rogers version and that the songs were inferior to those of the Rodgers and Hart stage musical.

In 2008, the American Film Institute nominated this film for its Top 10 Fantasy Films list.

See also
 List of films featuring eclipses

References

External links

 
 
 
 

1949 films
1940s fantasy comedy films
1949 musical comedy films
American adventure comedy films
American fantasy comedy films
American fantasy adventure films
American musical fantasy films
Films scored by Victor Young
Films directed by Tay Garnett
Films based on American novels
Films based on fantasy novels
Films based on A Connecticut Yankee in King Arthur's Court
Films set in the 6th century
Paramount Pictures films
Arthurian films
Films about time travel
American musical comedy films
1940s American films